Blücher or Bluecher is a German surname. The Russified form is Blyukher.  Notable people with the surname include:

Gebhard Leberecht von Blücher (1742–1819), a Napoleonic era Prussian general
Evelyn, Princess Blücher (1876–1960), diarist and memoirist, wife of Gebhard von Blücher (1865–1931)
Franz Blücher (1896–1959), German politician
Heinrich Blücher (1899–1970), German philosopher
Vasily Blücher (1899–1938), Marshal of the Soviet Union (named after the Prussian general)
Wolfgang Graf von Blücher (1917–1941), German World War II paratrooper
Erik Blücher (born 1953), expatriate Norwegian far-right activist

Occupational surnames
German-language surnames